Mariam Diakité (born 11 April 1995) is an Ivorian professional footballer who plays for Division 1 Féminine club FC Fleury 91. She was part of the Ivorian squad for the 2015 FIFA Women's World Cup.

See also
List of Ivory Coast women's international footballers

References

External links
 
 Profile at FIF 

1995 births
Living people
Ivorian women's footballers
Ivory Coast women's international footballers
Place of birth missing (living people)
Women's association football defenders
2015 FIFA Women's World Cup players
Ivorian expatriate footballers
Ivorian expatriate sportspeople in Belarus
Expatriate women's footballers in Belarus